The 1982 Grand Prix la Serenisima, also known as the Buenos Aires Grand Prix, was an Association of Tennis Professionals men's tennis tournament held in Buenos Aires, Argentina and took place from 1 February through 7 February 1982. It was the 16th edition of the tournament and first-seeded Guillermo Vilas won the singles title.

Finals

Singles

 Guillermo Vilas defeated  Alejandro Ganzábal 6–2, 6–4
 It was Vilas's 1st singles title of the year and the 53rd of his career.

Doubles
 Hans Kary /  Zoltán Kuhárszky defeated  Ángel Giménez /  Manuel Orantes 7–5, 6–2
 It was Kary's only title of the year and the 4th of his career. It was Kuharszky's only title of the year and the 1st of his career.

References

External links 
 ITF tournament edition details

 
Grand Prix la Serenisima
South American Championships
Grand Prix la Serenisima